is a video game released and developed by Konami on the LaserDisc system in 1984 and published by both Konami and Centuri. It first debuted at the Amusement and Music Operators Association (AMOA) Show in October 1983 and was later released to the public in early 1984. In addition to its LaserDisc version, two versions of a Badlands video game cabinet exist, one produced by Konami, and one by Centuri. In 1978, Konami released 433 different video game machines under the trade name Badlands.

Plot
Badlands follows a cowboy named Buck seeking vengeance on a gang of outlaws and its leader, Landolf, for the murder of his wife and children.

Gameplay
Badlands is a first-person shooter action-adventure video game set in a wild west fantasy world. The game's arcade cabinet consists of one large "shoot" button. Badlands' gameplay consists of animated cutscenes, requiring players to shoot and react to environmental hazards and enemies. The game uses a life system, granting the player three lives upon starting. Losing all lives ends the game. The aim of the game is to eliminate outlaws and claim their bounties.

Reception 
In Japan, Game Machine listed Badlands on their September 15, 1984, issue as the second most-successful upright arcade unit of the month.

References

External links
 Dragon's Lair Project
 
 
 arcade-history.com

1984 video games
Arcade video games
Konami games
LaserDisc video games
MSX games
Western (genre) video games
Konami arcade games
Video games developed in Japan